Edward Ashe may refer to:
 Edward Ashe (died 1656), Member of Parliament for Heytesbury 1640–52
 Edward Ashe (died 1731), his son, Member of Parliament for Heytesbury 1679–89
 Edward Ashe (died 1748), Member of Parliament for Heytesbury 1695–1747